

Events
April 12 – Possible premiere of Johann Sebastian Bach's last St Mark Passion pastiche (BC D 5) at St. Thomas Church, Leipzig. In addition to two movements by Bach, he incorporates seven arias from George Frideric Handel's Brockes Passion HWV 48 into the work.
August 1748 – October 1749 – Repeat (possible concert hall) performance by Bach of Handel's Brockes Passion HWV 48 in a version by Bach.
1748–1749 – Johann Sebastian Bach composes his Mass in B minor BWV 232 (BC E 1).
Holywell Music Room, Oxford, England, the first purpose-built concert hall in Europe, is opened.
Nicola Porpora becomes Kapellmeister at Dresden.:

Classical Music
Johan Agrell – 6 Keyboard Sonatas, Op. 2
Johann Sebastian Bach – 18 Chorale Preludes, BWV 651–668 finished (composed 1740–1748)
Martin Berteau – 6 Cello Sonatas, Op. 1 
Michel Corrette 
Les Pantins (No. 17 in his 25 Concertos Comiques)
La Tourière (No. 18 in his 25 Concertos Comiques)
Elisabetta de Gambarini — Lessons and Songs Op. 2, for harpsichord
George Frideric Handel
Joshua, HWV 64, oratorio premiered, composed 1747
Alexander Balus, HWV 65, oratorio premiered, composed 1747
Susanna, HWV 66, oratorio composed, premiered 1749
Solomon, HWV 67, oratorio composed, premiered 1749
Jakob Friedrich Kleinknecht 
6 Flute Sonatas, Op. 1
3 Trio Sonatas, Op. 2
Jean-Pierre Pagin - 6 Violin Sonatas, Op. 1
Peter Pasqualino – 6 Cello Duets
Giovanni Alberto Ristori 
Didone abbandonata (secular cantata)
Lavinia a Turno, M.144 (secular cantata)
Giuseppe Tartini – 6 Violin Sonatas, Op. 6
Georg Philipp Telemann – Lukas Passion, TWV 5:33
Burke Thumoth – 12 Irish and 12 Scotch Airs with Variations

Opera
Joseph Bodin de Boismortier – Daphnis et Chloé, Op. 102
Baldassare Galuppi – Demetrio
Christoph W. Gluck – La Semiramide riconosciuta, Wq.13
Karl Heinrich Graun – Ifigenia in Aulide, GraunWV B:I:18
Johann Adolf Hasse – Demofoonte
Niccolò Jommelli – L’amore in maschera
Gennaro Manna – Lucio Papirio dittatore
Jean-Philippe Rameau
Zaïs, premiered on February 29
Pygmalion, RCT 52, premiered on August 27
Les surprises de l'Amour, premiered on November 27

Publications 
 Johann Sebastian Bach – 6 Choräle von verschiedener Art, BWV 645-650 (Zella: Johann Georg Schübler)
 Louis de Caix d'Hervelois – Pièces de viole, Livre 5 (Paris: Madame Boivin, Le Clerc et Brolonne)
Francesco Geminiani – Rules for Playing in a True Taste, Op. 8 (variations for solo or accompanied instrument)
 William Hayes – 6 Cantatas (London: Simpson)
Jean-Joseph de Mondonville – Pièces de Clavecin avec voix ou violon, Op. 5
Carlo Tessarini – Contrasto armonico … con suoi rinforzi, for 3 violins and basso continuo, Op. 10 (Paris)
Gregor Werner — Neuer und sehr curios- Musicalischer Instrumental-Calendar

Births
February – Hedvig Wigert, opera singer (died 1780)
February 5 – Christian Gottlob Neefe, conductor, teacher (Ludwig van Beethoven was a student), and composer (died 1798)
March 5 — William Shield, violinist and composer (died 1829)
May 5 – Francesco Azopardi, music theorist and composer (died 1809)
April 20 – Georg Michael Telemann, composer (died 1831)
August 4 – Maximilian Stadler, editor and composer (died 1833)
August 11 – Joseph Schuster, composer (died 1812)
August 31 – Jean-Étienne Despréaux, singer, dancer and composer (died 1820)
November 30 – Joachim Albertini, composer (died 1812)

Deaths
January 26 – Pierre Rameau, dancing-master (born 1674)
February 26 – Jean-Baptiste Landé, ballet dancer
March 7 – William Corbett, violinist and composer (born 1680)
March 10 – Giovanni Perroni, cellist and composer (born 1688)
March 17 – Charles King, choir-master and composer (born 1687)
March 23 — Johann Gottfried Walther, composer and theoretician (born 1684)
April 6 – David Kellner, German composer (born c.1670)
November 25 — Isaac Watts, hymn writer (born 1674)
date unknown
Jacques Loeillet, oboist and composer (born 1685)
David Tecchler, luthier (born 1666)

References

 
18th century in music
Music by year